The Black Sea Region is a geographical region of Turkey. The largest city in the region is Samsun. Other big cities are Trabzon, Ordu, Tokat, Giresun, Rize, Amasya and Sinop.

It is bordered by the Marmara Region to the west, the Central Anatolia Region to the south, the Eastern Anatolia Region to the southeast, the Republic of Georgia to the northeast, and the Black Sea to the north.

Subdivision 

 Western Black Sea Section
Inner Western Black Sea Area
Küre Mountains Area
 Central Black Sea Section
 Canik Mountains Area
 Inner Central Black Sea Area
 Eastern Black Sea Section
 Eastern Black Sea Coast Area
 Upper Kelkit - Çoruh Gully

Ecoregions

Terrestrial

Palearctic

Temperate broadleaf and mixed forests 
 Euxine-Colchic deciduous forests

Temperate coniferous forests 
 Northern Anatolian conifer and deciduous forests

Provinces 

Provinces that are entirely in the Black Sea Region:
 Amasya
 Gümüşhane 
 Bartın
 Bolu
 Giresun
 Kastamonu
 Karabük
 Ordu
 Rize
 Samsun
 Sinop
 Tokat
 Trabzon
 Zonguldak

Provinces that are mostly in the Black Sea Region:
 Artvin
 Bayburt
 Çorum
 Düzce

Provinces that are partially in the Black Sea Region:
 Ankara
 Ardahan
 Çankırı
 Erzincan
 Erzurum
 Sivas
 Yozgat

Population 

The Black Sea region's population is 8,439,213 based on the 2010 census. 4,137,166 people live in cities and 4,301,747 people in villages. This makes it the only one of the seven regions of Turkey in which more people live in rural rather than urban areas.

Though the overwhelming majority is Turkish, the east of the region is also inhabited by the Laz, a people who speak a Kartvelian language which is closely related to Georgian and converted to Islam from Georgian Orthodoxy in the late Ottoman period as well as Muslim Georgians, also the Hemsin, Armenian converts to Islam, and Pontic Greeks, who converted to Islam in the 17th century. While a large community (around 25% of the population) of Christian Pontic Greeks remained throughout the Pontus area (including Trabzon and Kars in northeastern Turkey/the Russian Caucasus) until the 1920s, and in parts of Georgia and Armenia until the 2010s, preserving their own customs and dialect of Greek, the vast majority have since left, mainly to Greece. However, most Muslim Pontic Greeks remained in Turkey.

Geography 
The Black Sea region has a steep, rocky coast with rivers that cascade through the gorges of the coastal ranges. A few larger rivers, those cutting back through the Pontic Mountains (Doğu Karadeniz Dağları), have tributaries that flow in broad, elevated basins. Access inland from the coast is limited to a few narrow valleys because mountain ridges, with elevations of 1,525 to 1,800 meters in the west and 3,000 to 4,000 meters in the east in Kaçkar Mountains, form an almost unbroken wall separating the coast from the interior. The higher slopes facing northwest tend to be densely forested. Because of these natural conditions, the Black Sea coast historically has been isolated from Anatolia.

The mild, damp oceanic climate of the Black Sea coast makes commercial farming profitable. Running from Zonguldak in the west to Rize in the east, the narrow coastal strip widens at several places into fertile, intensely cultivated deltas. The Samsun area, close to the midpoint, is a major tobacco-growing region; east of it are numerous citrus groves. East of Samsun, the area around Trabzon is world-renowned for the production of hazelnuts, and farther east the Rize region has numerous tea plantations. All cultivable areas, including mountain slopes wherever they are not too steep, are sown or used as pasture. The western part of the Black Sea region, especially the Zonguldak area, is a center of coal mining and heavy industry.

The North Anatolian Mountains in the north are an interrupted chain of folded highlands that generally parallel the Black Sea coast. In the west, the mountains tend to be low, with elevations rarely exceeding 1,500 meters, but they rise in an easterly direction to heights greater than 3,000 meters south of Rize. Lengthy, trough-like valleys and basins characterize the mountains. Rivers flow from the mountains toward the Black Sea. The southern slopes—facing the Anatolian Plateau—are mostly unwooded, but the northern slopes contain dense growths of both deciduous and evergreen trees.

Climate

Black Sea region has an oceanic climate (Köppen climate classification: Cfb); with high and evenly distributed rainfall the year round. At the coast, summers are warm and humid, and winters are cool and damp. The Black Sea coast receives the greatest amount of precipitation and is the only region of Turkey that receives high precipitation throughout the year. The eastern part of that coast averages 2,500 millimeters annually which is the highest precipitation in the country. Snowfall is quite common between the months of December and March, snowing for a week or two, and it can be heavy once it snows.

The water temperature in the whole Turkish Black Sea coast is always cool and fluctuates between 8° and 20 °C throughout the year.

Tourism 
Those who dislike the heat and humidity of the summer in the Mediterranean and Aegean regions of Turkey, escape to the plateaux of the mountains in the Black Sea region which are almost permanently cloudy and receive immense amounts of rain and are very attractive with rich flora and fauna, forests, crater lakes, waterfalls, rivers, streams, mountain and nature walk, rafting, canoe and winter sports, hunting and fishing, grass skiing, healing water and local dishes.

See also 
 Provinces of Turkey
 List of fish of the Black Sea
 Trabzon Province
 World Trade Center Trabzon
 Geography of Turkey
 Black Sea topics
 Bithynia
 Paphlagonia
 Pontus
 Lazistan
 Colchis

References 

 Serander.net: Blacksea Region Culture
 Giresunda.com: Karadeniz
 9sn.net/Turkiye: Karadeniz Resimleri
 Cucupedi.com: Karadeniz'de Gezilecek Yerler

 
Anatolia
Black Sea
Regions of Turkey